Northern Devon Healthcare NHS Trust ran North Devon District Hospital in Barnstaple and community hospitals in Ilfracombe, Bideford, Holsworthy and Bideford.  It merged with the Royal Devon and Exeter NHS Foundation Trust in April 2022 to form the Royal Devon University Healthcare NHS Foundation Trust.

History
The trust decided in October 2015 to close medical beds in the community hospitals in Ilfracombe and Bideford in order to save money.

The trust was criticised by the Taxpayers Alliance in December 2013 for spending more than £370,000 on 870 tablet devices for staff. The trust said that these devices were necessary for staff who covered a wide area and saved money.

The chair and chief executive both left in 2018 and the chair and chief executive of the Royal Devon and Exeter NHS Foundation Trust are to take their places although the two organisations remained separate.

Performance

In April 2014 the trust achieved a high rating in a Care Quality Commission (CQC) survey of adult inpatients, with not a single low score given for any aspect of care. It was rated better than other hospitals nationally for specific aspects of nursing regarding communication, confidence and trust and whether there were enough nurses on duty.

It was named by the Health Service Journal as one of the top hundred NHS trusts to work for in 2015.  At that time it had 3,603 full-time equivalent staff and a sickness absence rate of 3.43%. 76% of staff recommend it as a place for treatment and 68% recommended it as a place to work.

The trust won a bid in March 2016 to be “prime contractor” for domiciliary care services in Northern and Mid Devon, in a contract let by the clinical commissioning groups (CCG) in the county and Devon County Council, worth £7080million over five years.   It manages providers of domiciliary care services in three areas of the county through Devon Cares.  It has significantly reduced the number patients awaiting a care package who are unable to leave hospital.

See also
 List of NHS trusts
 Healthcare in Devon

References

External links

Health in Devon
Defunct NHS trusts